Vahagn Militosyan (born 10 June 1993), is an armenian professional footballer who plays as a striker for French club US Changé.

Club career
Born in Etchmiadzin, Militosyan began his career with Stade Lavallois as a teenager, and before the 2010–11 season, while he was only 17, he was promoted to the team's reserve squad. However, most of the time he was playing for the team's youth side and played only two games for the club while failing to score a goal.

In the 2011–12 season, Militosyan again played for the team's reserve side, but played in only one match. Before the start of the 2012–13 season, he was promoted to the team's main squad and took part in one league match. The following season, he made three appearances.

Before the start of the 2014–15 season, Militosyan signed for fourth-tier club Grenoble Foot 38.

International career
Militosyan was called up to the national football team of Armenia, but as of August 2014 has not made any appearances.

Militosyan has appeared for Western Armenia, a team representing the Armenian indigenous people primarily from the region of Western Armenia which according to Armenian scholars was on territory occupied by Turkey.

References

External links
 
 
 
 Futbalnet profile

1993 births
Living people
Association football forwards
Armenian footballers
Armenian expatriate footballers
French people of Armenian descent
Stade Lavallois players
Grenoble Foot 38 players
UJA Maccabi Paris Métropole players
Ligue 2 players
MFK Topvar Topoľčany players
3. Liga (Slovakia) players
KFC Komárno players
2. Liga (Slovakia) players
FC Nitra players
ŠKF Sereď players
Slovak Super Liga players
US Changé players
Division d'Honneur players
Championnat National 3 players
Expatriate footballers in France
Expatriate footballers in Slovakia
Armenian expatriate sportspeople in Slovakia
Armenian expatriate sportspeople in France